The 25th Tianyuan began on 2 February and concluded on 13 April 2011. Defending champion Chen Yaoye kept his title, defeating challenger Zhou Hexi in two games.

Tournament

Finals

See also
For information on the preliminary rounds, see Igo-Kisen.

References

2011 in go
Go competitions in China